The President Ho Chi Minh Mausoleum Defence Force (also known as the 969 Corps) under the Ministry of National Defense of Vietnam, is the specialised force of the People's Army of Vietnam tasked with protecting and providing ceremonial guards for the Ho Chi Minh Mausoleum.

Due to the mausoleum's large size, high number of visitors, the technical specifications for the preservation of Ho Chi Minh's body, need for security and need for propaganda work, on 28 December 1975, the Standing Committee of the Central Military Commission issued Decision No. 279/VP-QU approving the establishment of the Ho Chi Minh Mausoleum Protection Command. On 14 May 1976, the Ministry of National Defense issued Decision No. 109/QD-QP restructuring the command as the President Ho Chi Minh Mausoleum Defence Force, directly under the Ministry of National Defense.

References

 
A
Ceremonial units and formations
Military units and formations established in 1976
1976 establishments in Vietnam
Ho Chi Minh